The Government Degree College Handwara (Urdu;) also known as GDC Handwara is  University Grants Commission co-educational autonomous degree college, in Handwara town, Kupwara district, in the Indian union territory of Jammu and Kashmir. It is affiliated to University of Kashmir, and is recognised by UGC under 2(f) and 12(b) of UGC Act 1956.

Location
The campus of the college is spread over an area of 100 Kanals (12.5 acre) of land.

Establishment
Government of Jammu and Kashmir established the college under the Chief-Ministership of Dr. Farooq Abdullah in the year 1988. It was founded with a view to promote the need of education and to help the economically and socially under privileged students of this rural backward area to achieve the higher education.

Courses offered 
GDC Handwara offers bachelors courses in Arts, Science, Commerce and Computer subjects. College offers 34 combinations of 21 subjects. Geography & English literature as subjects are also available only in this college of Kupwara District.

Bachelors Courses 

 Bachelor of Arts
 Bachelor of Science (Medical)
 Bachelor of Business Administration 
 Bachelor of Science (Non-Medical)
 Bachelor of Commerce
 Bachelor of Computer Applications

References 

Degree colleges in Kashmir Division
Universities and colleges in Jammu and Kashmir
University of Kashmir
1988 establishments in Jammu and Kashmir
Educational institutions established in 1988
Colleges affiliated to University of Kashmir